Harry C. Myers (September 5, 1882 – December 25, 1938) was an American film actor and director, sometimes credited as Henry Myers. He performed in many short comedy films with his wife Rosemary Theby. Myers appeared in 330 films between 1908 and 1938, and directed more than 50 films between 1913 and 1917.

Biography 
He was born in New Haven, Connecticut, on September 5, 1882. When he was young, Myers moved to Philadelphia, where he received most of his education. He studied drawing and design at the Philadelphia Art School for three years. Turning from art to drama, he acted for two years with the Girard Avenue Stock Company and with other troupes in subsequent years.

Myers had been a theatre actor for 10 years before he went into films as an actor for Siegmund Lubin's Lubin Studios in 1909. By 1914, he was directing his own comedy shorts featuring him and his wife, Rosemary Theby, for Universal, the Vim Comedy Company, and Pathé studios.

After 1920 he had many starring roles in feature-length films, the most notable of which was as the eccentric alcoholic millionaire in Charlie Chaplin's City Lights (1931). His career declined after the introduction of sound films.

Myers died on December 25, 1938, in Hollywood, California, at age 56, from pneumonia.

Partial filmography 

 The Guerrilla (1908)
 The Almighty Dollar (1910, Short) – Effeminate Gentleman
 When the Earth Trembled (1913) – Paul Girard Jr.
 Baby (1915, Short) – Harry – the Husband
 The Earl of Pawtucket (1915) – Arthur Weatherbee
 The Man of Shame (1915) – Lt. Du Fresne
 The Face in the Dark (1918) – Jim Weaver
 Conquered Hearts (1918) – Stonne
 Out of the Night (1918) – Ralph Evanns
 The Masked Rider (1919) – Harry Burrel
 The Wildcatter (1919)
 A Modern Lochinvar (1919)
 Sky-Eye (1920) – Harry Mangin
 The Notorious Mrs. Sands (1920) – Grey Sands
 45 Minutes from Broadway (1920) – Daniel Cronin
 Peaceful Valley (1920) – Ward Andrews
 The Prospector's Vengeance (1920, Short)
 A Connecticut Yankee in King Arthur's Court (1921) – The Yankee / Martin Cavendish
 On the High Card (1921) – Harry Holt
 The March Hare (1921) – Tod Rollins
 Oh Mary Be Careful (1921) – Bobby Burns
 Nobody's Fool (1921) – Artemis Alger
 R.S.V.P. (1921) – Benny Fielding
 Why Trust Your Husband? (1921) – Elmer Day
 Handle with Care (1922) – Ned Picard
 Turn to the Right (1922) – Gilly
 When the Lad Came Home (1922)
 Boy Crazy (1922) – J. Smythe
 The Adventures of Robinson Crusoe (1922, Serial) – Robinson Crusoe
 Kisses (1922) – Bill Bailey
 Top o' the Morning (1922) – John Garland
 In the Days of Buffalo Bill (1922) – Andrew Johnson
 The Beautiful and Damned (1922) – Dick
 Brass (1923) – Wilbur Lansing
 Main Street (1923) – Dave Dyer
 The Brass Bottle (1923) – Horace Ventimore
 Little Johnny Jones (1923) – The Chauffeur
 The Printer's Devil (1923) – Sidney Fletcher
 The Common Law (1923) – Cardemon
 The Bad Man (1923) – Red Giddings
 Stephen Steps Out (1923) – Harry Stetson
 The Marriage Circle (1924) – Detective
 Daddies (1924) – Robert Audrey
 Listen Lester (1924) – Listen Lester
 Behold This Woman (1924) – Eugene de Seyre
 Tarnish (1924) – The Barber
 Reckless Romance (1924) – Christopher Skinner
 She Wolves (1925) – Henri de Latour
 Zander the Great (1925) – Texas
 Grounds for Divorce (1925) – Count Zappata
 Trails End (1925) – Harry Kenyon
 The Nutcracker (1926) – Oscar Briggs
 The Beautiful Cheat (1926) – Jimmy Austin
 Monte Carlo (1926) – Greves
 Up in Mabel's Room (1926) – Jimmie Larchmont
 Get 'Em Young (1926, Short) – Orvid Joy
 Exit Smiling (1926) – Jesse Watson
 The First Night (1927) – Hotel Detective
 Getting Gertie's Garter (1927) – Jimmy Felton
 The Bachelor's Baby (1927) – Bill Taylor
 The Girl in the Pullman (1927) – Jimmy Mason
 The Dove (1927) – Mike
 The Chinatown Mystery (1928)
 The Street of Illusion (1928) – Lew Fielding
 Dream of Love (1928) – The Baron
 The Clean Up (1929) – Jimmy
 Montmartre Rose (1929)
 Wonder of Women (1929) – Bruno Heim
 City Lights (1931) – Eccentric Millionaire
 Meet the Wife (1931) – Harvey Lennox
 Convicted (1931) – Sturgeon
 A Strange Adventure (1932) – Police Officer Ryan
 The Savage Girl (1932) – Amos P. Stitch
 Damaged Lives (1933) – Nat Franklin
 The Important Witness (1933) – Drunk
 Mary Stevens, M.D. (1933) – Nervous Patient (uncredited)
 Police Call (1933) – Steward
 Rainbow Over Broadway (1933) – Berwiskey
 Managed Money (1934, Short) – Mr. George Rogers
 Allez Oop (1934, Short) – Circus Spectator
 We Live Again (1934) – Bailiff (uncredited)
 Mississippi (1935) – Stage Manager (uncredited)
 Barbary Coast (1935) – Saloon Patron (uncredited)
 The Calling of Dan Matthews (1935) – Club Owner (uncredited)
 The Milky Way (1936) – Photographer at Apartment (uncredited)
 F-Man (1936) – Man in Group (uncredited)
 One Rainy Afternoon (1936) – Man in Theatre (uncredited)
 San Francisco (1936) – Reveler (uncredited)
 Kelly the Second (1936) – Fight Spectator with Cigars (uncredited)
 Hollywood Boulevard (1936) – Harry Myers- Actor at Trocadero Bar
 Lady Be Careful (1936) – Passerby (uncredited)
 Mr. Cinderella (1936) – Man at Party Helping Splashed Woman (uncredited)
 Mixed Magic (1936, Short) – (uncredited)
 Rich Relations (1937)
 Parnell (1937) – Man in Courtroom (uncredited)
 A Day at the Races (1937) – Party Guest (uncredited)
 Walter Wanger's Vogues of 1938 (1937) – Husband (uncredited)
 Double or Nothing (1937) – Nightclub Patron (uncredited)
 Dangerously Yours (1937) – Costume Ball Participant (uncredited)
 Stand-In (1937) – Bank Board Member (uncredited)
 The Adventures of Tom Sawyer (1938) – Irate Churchgoer (uncredited)
 A Slight Case of Murder (1938) – Partygoer (uncredited)
 Dangerous to Know (1938) – Guest at Party (uncredited)
 Racket Busters (1938) – Court Stenographer (uncredited)
 Block-Heads (1938) – Drunk (uncredited)
 The Spider's Web (1938, Serial) – Detective (uncredited)
 Kentucky (1938) – Dancer (uncredited)
 The Oklahoma Kid (1939) – Banker (uncredited)
 I'm from Missouri (1939) – Mule Man (uncredited)
 Zenobia (1939) – Party Guest Who Didn't Mind (uncredited)

References

Further reading 
 The Moving picture world – Moving Picture Exhibitors' Association – 1914 – Performing Arts – Harry C. Myers. Lubin Actor-Director
 Guide to the silent years of American cinema by Donald W. McCaffrey, Christopher P. Jacobs – Harry Myers

External links 

1882 births
1938 deaths
20th-century American male actors
American male film actors
American male silent film actors
American film directors
Deaths from pneumonia in California
Male actors from New Haven, Connecticut